Travis Montorius Greene (born January 17, 1984) is an American gospel musician and pastor.

Music career 
Greene began his music career in 2007 with the release of The More via Greenelight Records. He has since released two studio albums, Stretching Out in 2010, The Hill  in 2015, and an extended play, Intentional in 2015. Travis Greene's third album Crossover: Live From Music City was released in 2017 as a live album. Greene's music has charted on the Billboard Top Gospel Albums and the Top Gospel Songs charts and he has been nominated for multiple awards, including five Grammy Awards and 13 Stellar Awards.

Greene and his wife lead Forward City Church in Columbia, South Carolina.

Early life 
Travis Montorius Greene was born on January 17, 1984, in Delaware, to mother, Charleather Greene and was raised in Warner Robins, Georgia. Greene's father died of an aneurysm in 1989. Greene was originally a still-born, but was resuscitated. A few years later, at the age of four he was resuscitated after a four-storied building fall, while he was in Germany.

Career
Greene's music recording started in 2007, with the release, The More, that came out on December 4, 2007, from Greenelight Records. The subsequent release, Stretching Out, a studio album, was released on June 8, 2010, by Pendulum Records.

The release of Stretching Out was Greene's introduction to the Billboard Top Gospel Albums chart, where it placed at No. 27. Songs, "Still Here" and "Prove My Love", both charted on the Billboard Top Gospel Songs chart, at peaks of Nos. 17 and 29, respectively.

Greene released an extended play, Intentional, on August 21, 2015, with RCA Inspiration, where this placed at No. 3 on the Billboard Top Gospel Albums chart. His song, "Intentional", peaked at No. 1 on the Billboard Top Gospel Songs chart .

Greene's second studio album, The Hill, was released on October 30, 2015, from RCA Inspiration and charted at No. 1 on the Billboard Gospel charts.

Greene's rise in the gospel genre has been reported in Billboard Magazine, Rolling Out Magazine, Jet magazine, with performances at the Essence Music Festival, Trumpet Awards and BMI Trailblazers. In 2016, JET Magazine called Greene "The Future of Gospel".

In 2017, Greene received criticism for his decision to perform at President Donald Trump's inaugural ball.

On February 2, 2017, Greene recorded his third album Crossover: Live From Music City in Nashville, Tennessee.

On March 24, 2017, Greene led the field of nominees at the 2017 Stellar Gospel Music Awards by taking home seven awards. At the awards, Greene performed a medley of "Made a Way" alongside Gospel recording artists Israel Houghton, Jonathan McReynolds and Jonathan Butler.

Personal life 
Greene married Jackie Gyamfi and together they co-pastor Forward City Church in Columbia, South Carolina.

Discography

Studio albums

Live albums

Extended plays

Singles

Awards and nominations

Grammy Awards

Billboard Music Awards

Stellar Awards
In 2017, Greene received seven Stellar Awards. In 2018, he received four Stellar Awards.

References

External links
 

1984 births
Living people
African-American songwriters
African-American Christians
Musicians from Delaware
Musicians from Georgia (U.S. state)
Musicians from Charlotte, North Carolina
Musicians from South Carolina
RCA Records artists
Songwriters from Delaware
Songwriters from Georgia (U.S. state)
Songwriters from North Carolina
Songwriters from South Carolina
21st-century African-American people
20th-century African-American people